Gila (lit:To complain), is a Pakistani television soap opera starring Wahaj Ali along with Anzela Abbasi, daughter of actress Javeria Abbasi.

It was first aired on 5 December 2016, replacing Be Aitbaar. It aired every Monday to Friday  at 7:00pm PST.

Story
Anzela, the protagonist of this story, is suffering punishment for a murder she did not commit. The plot begins with Zavaar's murder on the wedding night backed by strong assumptions making Anzela guilty. Sanwal as well as Shaji (Zavaar's Brother) hit chances to marry Anzela. Will Anzela go for Sanwal, her old love, or Shaji, her brother-in-law?

Cast 
 Anzela Abbasi as Anzela
 Wahaj Ali as Sanwal/Ramis
 Sukaina Khan as Hafsa
 Fasi Sardar as Zain
 Humaira Bano as Sarwat
 Zainab Jameel as Sana
 Asad Siddiqui as Shajee
 Jahanzeb Khan as Zawaar
 Mohsin Gillani as Sanwal's father
 Javed Jamal as Jalal Mirza
 Naima Khan as Noor Bano
 Saman Ansari as Shaista
 Tabbasum Arif as Atiqa 
 Saad Azhar as Khalid 
 Mariam Mirza as Bushra
 Anas Ali Imran as Saaff
 Mariyam Khalif (Child star) as Zubi
 Abdul Rehman (Child star) as Hammad

See also 
 List of programs broadcast by Hum TV
 2016 in Pakistani television

References

External links 

 Official website

Pakistani drama television series
2016 Pakistani television series debuts
2017 Pakistani television series endings
Urdu-language television shows
Hum TV original programming
Hum TV